Aishwarya Rai (born 1 November 1973) is an Indian actress and former model. She has been called the "most beautiful woman in the world", Rai won the Miss India and Miss World pageants in 1994. Rai is the recipient of 145 accolades into her credit been the highest awarded actress till date. After a brief stint with modeling, Rai made her cinematic debut through the 1997 Tamil film Iruvar, a semi-biographical political drama, directed by Mani Ratnam. She followed with Aur Pyaar Ho Gaya, that marked her Bollywood debut and Jeans, her first commercial success. The latter India's submission for the Academy Award for Best Foreign Language Film for the year 1998.

Rai has also received two Filmfare Awards awards for Best Actress, and numerous times at Screen Awards, and IIFA Awards ceremonies for her on-screen performances.

In 1999 Rai received critical acclaim and several Best Actress awards for her performances in Hum Dil De Chuke Sanam and Taal; both films earned her a Filmfare Award for Best Actress nomination, with the former fetching her the award. The following year, she starred in Aditya Chopra's musical romantic drama Mohabbatein, which earned her a Filmfare Award for Best Supporting Actress nomination—her only nomination in the category until date—and was the highest-grossing film of the year. Rai received her second Filmfare Award for Best Actress for her role as "Parvati" in the period romantic drama Devdas (2002). After a brief hiatus, she acted in the heist thriller Dhoom 2 (2006). The film featuring an ensemble cast was her first major commercial success post the release of Devdas. Rai was appointed the member of the jury of the 2003 Cannes Film Festival; she was the first Indian actress to represent her country as a jury member in the festival. The next year, she collaborated with Mani Ratnam for the second time in his biographical film, Guru. She portrayed the role of her future husband Abhishek Bachchan's wife gaining her a seventh Filmfare Award for Best Actress nomination. Rai's portrayal as Jodhaa Bai in the 2008 epic film Jodhaa Akbar earned her another Filmfare nomination for Best Actress. In 2010, she made a comeback to Tamil film industry through Mani Ratnam's Raavanan and Shankar's science fiction film Enthiran. Rai was nominated for the Best Actress for the ninth time for her performance in Guzaarish (2010); her third collaboration with Sanjay Leela Bhansali.

She won Most Glamorous Star of the Year along with Hrithik Roshan for Dhoom 2 in 2007. She won the Outstanding Achievement in International Cinema at Awards of the International Indian Film Academy in 2009. She has won numerous awards at the International Indian Film Academy Awards, Star Screen Awards and Zee Cine Awards, among other ceremonies. In 2009, Rai was awarded the Padma Shri, the fourth-highest Indian civilian award, for her contributions to Indian cinema. Later that year, she was declared the Female Star of The Decade at the 10th IIFA Awards, held in Macau. In December 2010, she was declared the Actress of the Decade at the BIG Star Entertainment Awards. In March 2011, Rai was honoured by Karnataka Chief Minister B. S. Yeddyurappa at World Kannada Meet (Vishwa Kannada Sammelana) for her contributions to the arts. Later that month, she was presented with the Decade of Global Achievement Honour by FICCI.

In 2012, she finally accepted the second-highest Order of France, Ordre des Arts et des Lettres. Earlier, she refused it because her father was suffering from a serious illness, and she wanted her whole family to attend the award ceremony.

In a poll conducted by HollywoodBuzz to find "Top 30 World's Most Beautiful Women of 2014", Rai made it to the fourth position winning over 4 million votes from around the globe. During the Miss World 2014 award ceremony, Rai was presented with a special Lifetime Beauty with a Purpose award for charitable work.

National Honours and Recognitions
 1994 – Miss India World 1994
 2000 – Smita Patil Memorial Award for Best Actress.
 2002 – The Times of India named Aishwarya Rai No.1 on the list of the "100 Most Beautiful Indian Women in the Past Century".
 2002 – Rajiv Gandhi Award for Excellence in Field of Entertainment.
 2003 – V. Shantaram Awards – Best Actress for Devdas
 2004 – GR8! Women Award for Contribution to Cinema(Special Laurel).
 2007 – Femina "Most Powerful Indian Woman".
 2008 – She was selected by Verve in its list of the country's "Most Powerful Women" 
 2009 – V. Shantaram Awards – Best Actress for Jodhaa Akbar
 2009 – Padma Shri, India's fourth highest civilian award from the Government of India for her contribution to cinema. She created a history by being the youngest actress to receive the award.
 2009 – Verve "Most Influential Indian Woman".
 2009 – Declared as "The Most Powerful Female Actor in India". The first ever extensive research by a popular research agency(Hansa Research) that was conducted of such magnitude to measure Celebrity Power in India; concentrating on different attributes like Popularity, media presence, power of persuasion and image attributes. This all India research also revealed that Aishwarya Rai Bachchan is amongst the most persuasive and likeable celebrity in India. She has also garnered over 98.8% of recognition as well as recall value which is at par with cinematic legends like Amitabh Bachchan and cricketing star Sachin Tendulkar. Incidentally, she is the only female who is part of the top 10 recognized celebrities from all walks of life.
 2009 – Filmfare's "Most Beautiful People".
 2010 – The India Today Women Award for Global Achievement.
 2010 – GR8! Women Award for Social services and international recognition.
 2010 – Teacher's Achievement Award – Teacher's people achievers award.
 2011 – Femina "India's Most Beautiful Woman".
 2011 – A newer variety of guava, produced by Padma Shri holticulturist Haji Kaleemullah was named after her.
 2011 – FICCI Frames Excellence Awards – Decade of Global Achievement for contribution to Hindi cinema & acting.
 2011 – FICCI Frames Award of a Decade of Global Achievement
 2011 – Honoured with the Pazhassi Raja Purashkaram ‘Abhinaya Kaala Ratna’ instituted by the Pazhassi Raja Charitable Trust.
 2011 – Honoured by Karnataka Chief Minister B. S. Yeddyurappa at World Kannada Meet (Vishwa Kannada Sammelana) for her contributions to the arts.
 2012 – Ranked #2 among top "5 Indian Women Who Became Role Models Of Empowerment" alongside Mother Teresa, Kalpana Chawla, Indra Nooyi and Indira Gandhi.
 2013 – Filmfare Special Centenary Award for Best Actress 
 2013 – Giant Award – Outstanding Contribution to Indian Cinema 
 2013 –"Most Popular Actress"(Rank #1) in Filmfare 100 years of cinema issue.
 2013 – Ranked #2 in "Top 5 Global Icon" in Filmfare 100 years of cinema issue where Rai is the only Female in the list.
 2014 – Asiavision Awards – Icon Of India.
 2014 – The Times Of India's Forever Desirable woman.
 2015 – Hello! "India's Most Beautiful".
 2016 – Outlook Business Outstanding Women Awards – Outstanding Celebrity Woman of the Year.
 2016 – NRI Of The Year Award – Global Indian of the Year Award 
 2016 – Gauravvanta Gujarati Award
 2017 – Femina "Most Beautiful Indian Woman".
 2018 – 20 January 2018, Aishwarya Rai Honoured with First Ladies Award by President of India (Ram Nath Kovind) – Titled as the First Lady who had created a history by being the first actor to be recognised as a Global Icon from India and the first Indian actor to be a jury member at the prestigious Cannes Film Festival.Honouring her for these great achievements, the Ministry of Women and Child Development of Government of India has added her in the list of 112 women achievers who have achieved a first in any field and made the country proud.
2018 –  April 2018, Bunt Community Honoured Aishwarya Rai with "Woman of Substance" title.
 2018 – Femina "India's Most Beautful Woman 2018"

Miss World

Miss World is "The World's Oldest Running International Beauty Pageant". It was created in the United Kingdom by Eric Morley in 1951. Since Morley's death in 2000, Morley's widow, Julia Morley, has co-chaired the pageant. This pageant is one of the Big Four international beauty pageants—the most coveted beauty titles when it comes to international pageant competitions.

Winner
 1994 – Miss World 1994 Miss Photogenic
 2000 – Most Beautiful Miss World of All Time – Received the highest score of 9.911.
 2014 – Most Successful Miss World of All Time by the Miss World Organisation.
 2014 – Lifetime Beauty With a Purpose Award for humanitarian works by Miss World Organisation.

Miss India

Miss India or Femina Miss India is a national beauty pageant in India that annually selects representatives to compete in Miss World, one of the Big Four major international beauty pageants. It is organised by Femina, a women's magazine published by The Times Group. Since 2013, Femina also organizes Miss Diva separately which sends representatives to Miss Universe.

Winner
 1994 – Miss India World
 1994 – Miss Photogenic
 1994 – Miss Perfect Ten
 1994 – Miss Catwalk
 1994 – Miss Popular
 1994 – Miss Miraculous

Anandalok Puraskar Awards 
Anandalok Puraskar Awards or Anandalok Puraskar ceremony is one of the most prominent film events given for Bengali Cinemas in India. The Anandalok, only film magazine in Bengali language, published from Ananda Publishers and Ananda Bazar Patrika presents this Award (Puraskar).

BIG Star Entertainment Awards 
The BIG Star Entertainment Awards are presented annually by Reliance Broadcast Network Limited in association with Star India to honour personalities from the field of entertainment across movies, music, television, sports, theatre and dance. The award is touted to be a completely viewer driven award where in audience participation right from nominations to the final winners through SMS and online voting across the categories is used for deciding the winners.

Bollywood Movie Awards 
The Bollywood Movie Awards was an annual film award ceremony held between 1999 and 2007 in Long Island, New York, United States, celebrating films and actors from the Bollywood film industry based in Mumbai, India.

Filmfare Awards 
The Filmfare Awards are presented annually by The Times Group to honour both artistic and technical excellence of professionals. The Filmfare ceremony is one of the oldest film events in India. The awards were first introduced in 1954, the same year as the National Film Awards. Rai has won 2 awards from 11 nominations.

Indian Film Festival of Melbourne 
The Indian Film Festival of Melbourne (IFFM) is an annual Indian film festival based in Melbourne, Australia. It is presented by Film Victoria and the State Government of Victoria, and produced by Mind Blowing Films, a Melbourne-based distributor of Indian cinema across Australia and New Zealand. Founded in 2010, the festival was previously called Bollywood & Beyond, and from 2012 was re-established as an initiative of the Victorian Coalition Government Victorian Government that aims to strengthen ties between the Indian film industry and Victoria.

International Indian Film Academy Awards 
The International Indian Film Academy Awards (also known as the IIFA Awards) are a set of awards presented annually by the International Indian Film Academy to honour both artistic and technical excellence of professionals in Bollywood, the Hindi language film industry. Instituted in 2000, the ceremony is held in different countries around the world every year. Rai has won 2 competitive awards out of 6 nominations; and has also won 4 non-competitive awards.

Producers Guild Film Awards 
The Producers Guild Film Awards (previously known as the Apsara Film & Television Producers Guild Award) is an accolade given by the Apsara Producers Guild to recognize excellence in Indian film and television. Aishwarya Rai won 2 awards and 3 nominations.

Screen Awards 
The Screen Awards, is an annual awards ceremony held in India honouring professional excellence in the Bollywood Film Industry. The nomination and award selection is done by a panel of distinguished professionals from the industry.It was originally called the Screen Awards. Aishwarya Rai won 7 awards from 18 nominations.

Stardust Awards 
The Stardust Awards is an award ceremony for Hindi movies, which is sponsored by Stardust magazine. The first ceremony was held in 2004 for films released in 2003. Aishwarya Rai won 4 awards and 9 nominations.

Washington DC Area Film Critics Association Awards 
The Washington DC Area Film Critics Association Awards (WAFCA) is a group of film critics based in Washington, D.C. and founded in 2002. WAFCA is composed of nearly 50 DC-based film critics from television, radio, print, and internet. Annually, the group gives awards to the best in film as selected by its members by vote.

Zee Cine Awards 
The Zee Cine Awards (ZCA) is an awards ceremony for the Hindi film industry. Aishwarya Rai won 6 awards and 10 nominations.

International Film Festival and Awards of Australia
Winner

 2017 – Best Actress – Sarbjit

Sansui Awards
Winner
 2003 – Best Actress – Devdas

Filmfare Glamour & Style Awards 
Winner
 2014 –  Global Icon of the Year (Female)
 2014 –  Most Glamorous Real-Life Couple (Aishwarya Rai Bachchan & Abhishek Bachchan)
 2015 –  Global Icon of the Year (Female)
 2015 –  Most Glamorous Real-Life Couple (Aishwarya Rai Bachchan & Abhishek Bachchan)
 2016 –  Most Glamorous Star (Female)
 2016 –  Trendsetter Of The Year

HT Most Stylish Awards 
Winner

 2015 – Most Stylish Couple of the Year (Aishwarya Rai Bachchan & Abhishek Bachchan)
 2015 – Most Stylish Global Icon of the Year (Female) 
 2016 – Most Stylish Female Superstar 
 2016 – Most Stylish Couple (Aishwarya Rai Bachchan & Abhishek Bachchan)
 2018 – Timeless Style Diva

Vogue Beauty Awards
Winner

 2011 – Vogue Beauty Awards – Global Beauty Icon award.
 2017 – Vogue Beauty Awards – Most Beautiful Global Indian Icon of the Decade 
 2017 – Vogue Women Of The Year Awards – Vogue Influencer of the Decade'

HELLO! Hall of Fame Awards
Winner

 2010 – HELLO! Hall of Fame Awards – Global Icon Award.
 2016 – HELLO! Hall of Fame Awards – Glamour Icon of the Year 
 2019 – HELLO! Hall of Fame Awards – 25 Years Of Excellence In Cinema

GQ Men of The Year Awards
Winner

 2010 – GQ Men of The Year Awards – "Global Indian Woman"
 2010 – GQ Men of The Year Awards – Excellence Award.

NDTV Indian of the Year Awards
Winner

 2010 – NDTV Indian of the Year Awards – Icon of 21 years of Entertainment Award
 2010 – NDTV Indian of the Year Awards – Indian Icon of the Year.

Femina Beauty Awards
Winner

 2012 – L’Oréal Paris Femina Women Awards – The Iconic Woman of Worth Award
 2018 – Femina Beauty Awards – Global Beauty Icon
 2018 – Femina Beauty Awards – Powerhouse Entertainer for Two Decades

Cosmopolitan Awards
Winner

 2011 – Cosmopolitan Awards – Female of All Time
 2012 – Cosmopolitan Fun, Fearless Awards – Power Couple (Aishwarya Rai Bachchan & Abhishek Bachchan)

Other Awards
Winner
 2000 – Screen Videocon Award for Best Actress – Hum Dil De Chuke Sanam
 2000 – Priyadarshini International Award for Best Actress – Hum Dil De Chuke Sanam
 2000 – Rupa Filmgoers Millennium Award for Best Actress – Hum Dil De Chuke Sanam
 2000 – Stardust Millenium Award for Best Actress – Hum Dil De Chuke Sanam
 2001 – BWSX Fantasy Award Best Supporting Actress – Mohabbatein
 2002 – RACE Award Best Actress – Devdas
 2004 – F Awards - For Excellence in Indian Fashion – Female Celebrity Model of the Year
 2005 – MTV Immies – Best Performance in a Song ("Kajra Re" from Bunty Aur Babli)
 2006 – Zee Astitva Awards – Outstanding Contribution to Cinema 
 2007 – MTV Lycra Style Awards – Most Stylish Female for Dhoom 2 
 2007 – MTV Lycra Style Awards – Most Stylish Couple (along with Hrithik Roshan for Dhoom 2) 
 2008 – Central European Bollywood Award for Best Actress – Guru
 2008 – Reebok Zoom Glam Awards – Glam Couple Award (along with Abhishek Bachchan)
 2009 – Indian Youth Icon Awards – Global Face of the Year
 2010 – Masala Awards – Global Artist Of The Year 
 2010 – DNA India Style Awards – Beauty Icon Award 
 2011 – Big Ima Music Awards – The Best Visualized Female Song – "Udi" (Guzaarish)
 2017 – Lions Gold Award for Best Actress of the Year for Sarbjit

Media Honours and Recognitions
 2005 – Voted The Most Desired Dream Date.
 2006 – Ranked 1st in BollySpice.com Magazine's list of "Top 10 Actresses of 2006".
 2009 – A poll conducted by the newspaper Daily News and Analysis, she was voted as one of India's most popular icons.
 2010 – Ranked 2nd in The Times of India's "50 most desirable women" 
 2011 – Ranked 9th in The Times of India's "50 most desirable women". 
 2012 – Voted as the best-dressed celebrity on the red carpet in an online survey conducted by Yahoo! India.
 2012 – On Mother's Day 2012, Rai Voted as "Ideal Celebrity Mother in Bollywood".
 2013 – The Best of Filmfare – Iconic women who shaped our movie dreams.
 2014 – Most searched "Successful Indian Woman" on Google.
 2015 – Voted as "The Most Yummiest Mummy" with 72% votes as Yummiest mummy in Bollywood.
 2015 – Voted as "Best Dressed" at Cannes 2015 with 50.53% votes.
 2016 – "Most Successful Woman Achiever" in business/entrepreneur by Outlook Business Magazine.
 2017 – Filmfare "Most Powerful Girl of Showbiz" in Bollywood.
 2019 – 2019 Cannes Film Festival Best Dressed Readers’ Choice 
2019 - Ranked sixth India Most Trusted Personality List 2019 by TRA Actor (Female) category 
2020- Ranked thirteenth in the overall list Actor category of India Most Trusted Personality List TRA.

Notes

References

External links 
 List of awards and nominations received by Aishwarya Rai Bachchan at the Internet Movie Database

Lists of awards received by Indian actor